Chet is a first month of the Nanakshahi calendar, used within Sikhism. This month coincides with Chaitra in the Hindu calendar and the Indian national calendar, and March and April in the Gregorian and Julian calendars and is 31 days long.

March
14 March (1 Chet) - Nanakshahi New Year
14 March (1 Chet) - Gur Gadi of Guru Har Rai
19 March (6 Chet) - Joti Jot of Guru Hargobind
Hola Mohalla

April
9 April (27 Chet) - Birthday of Sahibzada Jujhar Singh Ji
14 April (1 Vaisakh) - The end of the month Chet and the start of Vaisakh

See also
Chaitra

References

Months of the Nanakshahi calendar
Sikh terminology